2014 Emmy Awards may refer to:

 66th Primetime Emmy Awards, the 2014 Emmy Awards ceremony that honored primetime programming during June 2013 – May 2014
 41st Daytime Emmy Awards, the 2014 Emmy Awards ceremony that honored daytime programming during 2013
 35th Sports Emmy Awards, the 2014 Emmy Awards ceremony that honored sports programming during 2013
 42nd International Emmy Awards, the 2014 ceremony that honored international programming

Emmy Award ceremonies by year